The 2021–22 Slovak Cup was the 53rd edition of the competition.

Slovan Bratislava were the defending champions, defeating Žilina in the 2021 final.

Slovan Bratislava managed to advance to the final again, but were defeated by their rivals Spartak Trnava.

Spartak Trnava earned automatic qualification for the UEFA Europa Conference League second qualifying round.

Format
The Slovak Cup is played as a knockout tournament. All matches that end up as a draw after 90 minutes are decided by penalty shoot-outs. All rounds are played as one-off matches except the semi-finals, which are played over two legs.

Round of 16
The draw for the round of 16 was held on 2 December 2021.

|-
!colspan="3" align="center"|1 March

|-
!colspan="3" align="center"|2 March

|-
!colspan="3" align="center"|9 March

|}

Quarter-finals 
The draw for the quarter-finals was held on 3 March 2022.

|-
!colspan="3" align="center"|15 March

|-
!colspan="3" align="center"|16 March

|}

Semi-finals
The draw for the semi-finals took place on 18 March 2022.

First leg

Second leg

Final

See also
2021–22 Slovak First Football League
2022–23 UEFA Europa Conference League

References

External links

Slovak Cup seasons
Cup
Slovak Cup